Krasnopartizansky (masculine), Krasnopartizanskaya (feminine), or Krasnopartizanskoye (neuter) may refer to:
Krasnopartizansky District, a district in Saratov Oblast, Russia
Krasnopartizansky (rural locality) (Krasnopartizanskaya, Krasnopartizanskoye), name of several rural localities in Russia